Frank McGurk may refer to:

Frank McGurk (racing driver) (1915–1982), American racecar driver
Frank C. J. McGurk, American psychologist
Frank McGurk (boxer), British boxer and Olympic competitor in 1908

See also
Francis McGurk (1909–1978), Scotland international footballer